The Uyghur Human Rights Policy Act of 2020 (S. 3744) is a United States federal law that requires various federal U.S. government bodies to report on human rights abuses by the Chinese Communist Party (CCP) and the Chinese government against Uyghurs in Xinjiang, China, including internment in the Xinjiang re-education camps.

On September 11, 2019, a version of the bill—the Uyghur Human Rights Policy Act of 2019—was passed in the United States Senate by unanimous consent. On December 3, 2019, a stronger version of the bill—the UIGHUR Act—was passed by the U.S. House of Representatives by a vote of 407–1.

On May 14, 2020, the Senate introduced and approved what would be the current 2020 bill. On May 27, 2020, the House passed the amended bill by a vote of 413–1, sending it to President Donald Trump for approval. The bill was signed by Trump into law on June 17, 2020.

Legislative history

On September 11, 2019, a version of the bill—S. 178, the Uyghur Human Rights Policy Act of 2019—passed in the U.S. Senate by unanimous consent.

On December 3, 2019, a stronger, amended version of the bill—the Uighur Intervention and Global Humanitarian Unified Response Act (or UIGHUR Act)—was passed by the U.S. House of Representatives by a vote of 407 to 1. The sole "no" vote was cast by Thomas Massie, Republican of Kentucky.

On the afternoon of May 14, 2020, a new version of the bill—S. 3744, the Uyghur Human Rights Policy Act of 2020—passed in the United States Senate by unanimous consent. The House approved the bill by a vote of 413–1 on May 27, 2020. The following month, on June 17, President Donald Trump signed the bill into law.

Legislation content and results
The bill directs: (1) the Director of National Intelligence to report to Congress on security issues caused by the Chinese government's reported crackdown on Uyghurs in Xinjiang; (2) the Federal Bureau of Investigation to report on efforts to protect Uyghurs and Chinese nationals in the United States; (3) the U.S. Agency for Global Media to report on Chinese media related issues in Xinjiang; and (4) the United States Department of State to report on the scope of the reported Chinese government crackdown on Uyghurs in Xinjiang.

U.S. President Donald Trump has to submit a report to Congress within 180 days. The report shall designate Chinese officials and any other individuals who are responsible for carrying out: torture; prolonged detention without charges and a trial; abduction; cruel, inhumane, or degrading treatment of Muslim minority groups; and other flagrant denials of the "right to life, liberty, or the security" of people in Xinjiang. Persons identified in the report would then be subject to sanctions which include asset blocking, visa revocation, and ineligibility for entry into the United States. Imposing sanctions against the officials can be declined by the President if he determines and certifies to Congress that holding back on sanctions is in the national interest of the United States.

The bill would also call on President Trump to impose sanctions under the Global Magnitsky Act on Xinjiang Communist Party Secretary Chen Quanguo, which would be the first time such sanctions would be imposed on a member of China's politburo. On July 9, 2020, the Trump administration imposed sanctions and visa restrictions against senior Chinese officials, including Quanguo, as well as Zhu Hailun, Wang Mingshan, and Huo Liujun. With sanctions, they and their immediate relatives are barred from entering the US and will have US-based assets frozen.

Reactions

Support
On the same day that President Trump signed the Act into law, former National Security Advisor John Bolton claimed that Trump had, on two occasions, told Chinese leader Xi Jinping to go forward with plans related to Uyghur internment.

Editorials in The New York Times and The Washington Post supported the passage of the Uyghur Human Rights Policy Act. Opinion pieces written in various publications also supported the passage of the Act.

The CCP claim of deradicalization drew criticism in an article by the Deccan Chronicle, while an article written by Srikanth Kondapalli made criticisms of the PRC's grand strategy for Xinjiang. Analysts cited in an article by Reuters said that Mainland China's response to passage of the Uyghur bill could be stronger than its reaction to the Hong Kong Human Rights and Democracy Act, while the BBC's China correspondent said that if the bill became law, then it would mark the most significant international attempt to pressure mainland China over its mass detention of the Uyghurs.

Uyghur community
On December 3, 2019, a World Uyghur Congress spokesman said that the House bill is important in opposing "China's continued push of extreme persecution," and that the organization looks forward to President Trump signing the bill. Various Uyghur activists, think tank analysts, and political representatives called on various governments to sanction Mainland Chinese officials for their perceived involvement in the Xinjiang conflict.

Uyghur-American lawyer Nury Turkel—who is a commissioner on the U.S. Commission on International Religious Freedom, the co-founder of the Uyghur Human Rights Project, and a former President of the Uyghur American Association—thanked President Trump for signing the Act and further wrote that, "It's a great day for America and the Uighur people." Turkel would also go on to say that the American government must use the new bill to impose sanctions on Chinese officials for religious persecution. He also urged Congress to pass a second bill, the Uyghur Forced Labor Prevention Act, which would direct U.S. Customs and Border Protection to presume that any goods produced in Xinjiang are the product of forced labor.

Memetrusul Hesen, a Uyghur and former resident of Kargilik County (Yecheng) in Xinjiang's Kashgar Prefecture, who is now a citizen of Kyrgyzstan, left China with his aged mother in 2016. After a brief period of contact via phone in 2016, he had no longer been able to speak with his family or any of the members of his extended family up to mid-2020, despite having filed numerous requests for information at the Chinese embassy. Hesen said that his mother, Halimihan Ahun, 92, sits and cries every day. In an interview with Radio Free Asia, Hesen expressed thanks to the United States for thinking about Uyghur suffering, and expressed hope the bill's passage could be a driving force for change.

Chinese government and allies
The Chinese government have called the bill a malicious attack on China and demanded that the United States prevent it from becoming law, warning that it would act to defend its interests as necessary. On December 4, 2019, Chinese Foreign Ministry spokesperson Hua Chunying said that the bill "wantonly smeared China's counter-terrorism and de-radicalization efforts." Four days later, Ezizi Ali—County Magistrate of Niya County and Vice Secretary of the Niya County County Communist Party Committee—and Parhat Rouzi—Vice Secretary and Commissioner of the Kashgar Prefecture Communist Party Committee—penned criticisms of the Act.

In December 2019, the Syrian Ministry of Foreign Affairs and Expatriates defended China's actions in Xinjiang and condemned the U.S. Uyghur human rights bill as a "blatant interference by the US in the internal affairs of the People’s Republic of China."

See also
 Uyghur Forced Labor Prevention Act
 Uyghur genocide
 Xinjiang internment camps
 Tibet Policy and Support Act
 Hong Kong Human Rights and Democracy Act
 Magnitsky Act
 Mihrigul Tursun
 Xinjiang conflict
 Zhu Hailun
 United States sanctions against China

References

External links
 House of Representatives bill text
 S. 178 Senate bill text
S. 3744 Senate bill text

United States foreign relations legislation
China–United States relations
Human rights legislation
Acts of the 116th United States Congress
Uyghurs
Sanctions legislation
United States sanctions
Sanctions against China
Religious policy in China